Technopol is the second tallest building in Petržalka (one of the Bratislava districts) and one of the tallest buildings in Bratislava.

It consists of two buildings  height and is located in the Kutlíkova street, 17, surrounding Chorvátske rameno in front of John Paul II. Square and The Holy family church.

Technopol serves as a headquarters of several companies, such as Technopol, a.s. and also Petržalka self-government office.

Construction 
The building was constructed in 1984 and serves predominantly for office spaces.

Vicinity 
In south front of the building there is a small park and the central square in the middle of which there is a so-called singing fountain. The fountain is in operation in certain days and has special light effects and a music accompaniment.

Buildings and structures in Bratislava
Buildings and structures completed in 1984